Marquart or Marquard of Burbach (died 1236) was a knight of the Livonian Brothers of the Sword (from 1210). He came from a noble family in Burbach, a few kilometers east of Marburg in western Germany.

Marquart was commander of Aizkraukle Castle between 1211 and 1231, and ruled Aizkraukle County from his seat. In 1229, he repelled the invasion of the Semigallians and was wounded in a duel with the ruler Viestards. Last mentioned in 1234, it is believed that he, together with many other warlords of the order, fell in the Battle of Saule in 1236.

References 

History of Latvia
1296 deaths